MOC, MoC, or moc may refer to:

In government and politics
 Member of Congress
 Ministry of Commerce
 Ministry of Communications
 Ministry of Construction
 Ministry of Culture

In religion
 Macedonian Orthodox Church
 Masorti on Campus, a Jewish organization in North America
 Montenegrin Orthodox Church
 Moorish Orthodox Church of America

In science and technology

In computing
 Microsoft Office Communicator, instant messaging software
 Meta Object Compiler (moc), a code generator used by the Qt development framework
 Model of computation, in computability theory
 Music on Console, a console audio player

In spaceflight
 Mars Orbiter Camera (formerly Mars Observer Camera), an instrument on NASA's Mars Global Surveyor orbiter
 Mission operations center, in spacecraft operations

Other uses in science and technology
 Meridional Overturning Circulation, an ocean circulation on Earth
 Method of characteristics, a technique for solving partial differential equations
 Microwave oven capacitor (high voltage)
 Minimum oxygen concentration, a concept in fire safety engineering
 Moc., the standard author abbreviation for naturalist José Mariano Mociño
 Molybdenum carbide, a hard and stable carbide of molybdenum

In sports and recreation
 Chattanooga Mocs (formerly Moccasins), teams of the University of Tennessee at Chattanooga
 Macedonian Olympic Committee
 Montenegrin Olympic Committee

Other uses 
 Management of Change (Change Management) 
 Maintenance of Certification, in U.S. medicine
 Market on close order, a type of order executed at or after the closing of a stock exchange
 Masters of Cinema, a DVD series and website
 Military occupation
 "Mint on card", a description of mint condition in retail or auctioning
 Mocoví language, spoken in Argentina, language code by ISO 639-3
 Montes Claros Airport (IATA code: MOC)
 Mount Olive College, North Carolina, U.S.
 Mozambique, license plate code
 My Own Creation, refers to custom build or assembly of toys like LEGO